This article lists the squads for the 2016 FIFA U-20 Women's World Cup, held in Papua New Guinea. Each competing federation was allowed a 21-player squad, which had to be submitted to FIFA.

Group A

Papua New Guinea
Coach:  Lisa Cole

Brazil
Coach:  Doriva Bueno

Sweden
Coach:  Calle Barrling

North Korea
Coach:  Hwang Yong-bong

Group B

Spain
Coach:  Pedro López

Canada
Coach:  Daniel Worthington

Japan
Coach:  Asako Takakura

Nigeria
Coach:  Peter Dedevbo

Group C

France
Coach:  Gilles Eyquem

United States
Coach:  Michelle French

Ghana
Coach:  Mas-Ud Didi Dramani

New Zealand
Coach:  Leon Birnie

Group D

Germany
Coach:  Maren Meinert

Venezuela
Coach:  José Catoya

Mexico
Coach:  Roberto Medina

South Korea
Coach:  Jong Song-chon

References

squads
FIFA U-20 Women's World Cup squads